Akakpokpo Okon was an Ibibio prince from the Ibom Kingdom around 1690-1720.  He was the son of the marriage between the king Obong Okon Ita and an Igbo woman from the Eze Agwu lineage. Akakpokpo Okon lead a successful coup against his brother Akpan Okon the Obong (king) with the support of the Eze Agwu, Nnachi, and the Nnubi dynasty in the final phases of the Aro-Ibibio Wars. Despite the fact that the coup was successful, Akakpokpo Okon was killed in combat.

External links 
http://www.aro-okigbo.com/history_of_the_aros.htm
https://web.archive.org/web/20081121232256/http://www.aronetwork.org/others/arohistory.html
https://www.aronewsonline.com/?p=651

Aro people
18th-century Nigerian people
Nigerian royalty
Ibibio people
Calabar